Tom Bailey is an English singer, DJ, composer and record producer.

Early life and career
In 2017, Bailey featured on the chill house song "Waiting" by producer Bjonr, as a vocalist. The song was released Tipsy Records. It was his second time collaborating with Bjorn, the first was in 2016 when he featured on the song "Broken", which was released via the Spinnin' Records sublabel, Source Recordings.

Discography

Charted singles

References

Further reading

English DJs
English electronic musicians
English record producers
English pop singers
Living people
Musicians from the West Midlands (county)
Deep house musicians
Techno musicians
Electronic dance music DJs
DJs from London
Year of birth missing (living people)